Vasilyevka is a rural locality (a selo) and the administrative center of Vasilyevskoye Rural Settlement, Anninsky District, Voronezh Oblast, Russia. The population was 586 as of 2010. There are 6 streets.

Geography 
Vasilyevka is located on the Vasilyevka River, 17 km west of Anna (the district's administrative centre) by road. Novonadezhdensky is the nearest rural locality.

References 

Rural localities in Anninsky District